Calcitrapessa leeana is a species of sea snail, a marine gastropod mollusk in the family Muricidae, the murex snails or rock snails.

Description

Distribution
This marine species occurs in Baja California.

References

External links
 Dall, W. H. (1890). Scientific results of explorations by the U. S. Fish Commission Steamer “Albatross”. No. VII. Preliminary report on the collection of Mollusca and Brachiopoda obtained in 1887–'88. Proceedings of the United States National Museum. 12 (773): 219-362, pls 5-14
 Barco, A.; Herbert, G.; Houart, R.; Fassio, G. & Oliverio, M. (2017). A molecular phylogenetic framework for the subfamily Ocenebrinae (Gastropoda, Muricidae). Zoologica Scripta. 46 (3): 322-335

Ocenebrinae
Gastropods described in 1890